Grimstock Hill, located north of the River Cole in Coleshill, Warwickshire, was the site of a Romano-British settlement discovered in 1978. The site included a temple complex with evidence of a circular wooden Iron Age temple, later replaced by a stone-built temples of the Roman period, developed in two phases. A settlement extending at least  was excavated to the south, with evidence including a bathhouse, ovens, ditches and walls.

References

Further reading

Coleshill, Warwickshire
Roman towns and cities in England
Iron Age sites in England
Archaeological sites in Warwickshire